The 2016 Rhode Island Democratic presidential primary were held on April 26 in the U.S. state of Rhode Island as one of the Democratic Party's primaries ahead of the 2016 presidential election.

The Democratic Party's primaries in Connecticut, Delaware, Maryland and Pennsylvania were held the same day, as were Republican primaries in the same five states, including their own Rhode Island primary.

Opinion polling

Results

Results by county

Analysis
With its socially liberal coalition of mostly white Irish Catholic/Portuguese Catholic/Italian Catholic voters, Rhode Island was seen as Bernie Sanders's best chance at victory in the so-called "Acela Primaries" on April 26. He pulled out a commanding, 11-point win in the Ocean State on election day. He carried all municipalities but four, winning in the major cities of Providence and Warwick.

Sanders' Rhode Island win limited Clinton's success in New England to slimmer victories in Massachusetts and Connecticut.

References

Rhode Island
Democratic primary
2016